Afraid of Heights is the fifth studio album by the Canadian rock band Billy Talent, released on July 29, 2016. It is the band's first album in four years following 2012's Dead Silence.

It is the first album recorded without drummer Aaron Solowoniuk who had suffered a multiple sclerosis relapse and had to take a hiatus from recording and performing to focus on his health. Jordan Hastings of Alexisonfire and Say Yes recorded the drums for the album and played on the supporting tour. The album sold approximately 53,000 units in its first week.

Recording and release 
On January 5, 2016, the band posted a photo of a Condenser microphone on their Facebook page, with the caption "It begins", alluding to the beginning of the recording for the album. On January 15, 2016, drummer Aaron Solowoniuk announced through a YouTube video that he would not be able to play drums for the foreseeable future due to a multiple sclerosis relapse. He also announced that Alexisonfire drummer, Jordan Hastings, would be recording the new album with the band, as well as performing on the tour supporting the album, though Solowoniuk would still be in the studio with the band and involved in a smaller capacity.

On May 12, 2016, the band released the first single off the album – "Afraid of Heights", for free streaming on Alternative Press. A day later, the single was released through YouTube, iTunes, Spotify and other digital retailers.

On June 3, 2016, the band released a lyric video for the album's second single – "Louder than the DJ". The song was performed live for the first time, a few days earlier, along with the first single "Afraid of Heights" and another new song – "Big Red Gun", on the band's first tour date of 2016, at the Anabuk Festival in Moscow, Russia.

On July 21, 2016, the band released the official music video for the first single off the album, "Afraid of Heights". It was directed by Alon Isocianu, and is the band's first video featuring Jordan Hastings on drums.

On August 11, 2016, the band released the official music video for the second single, "Louder than the DJ". It is a live performance video and was directed by the band's drummer Aaron Solowoniuk and the band's principal photographer Dustin Rabin.

Track listing

Japanese edition bonus track

Deluxe edition bonus disc

Personnel 
Billy Talent
 Ben Kowalewicz – lead vocals
 Ian D'Sa – guitar, vocals, piano, programming, additional percussion, production
 Jon Gallant – bass, backing vocals
 Aaron Solowoniuk – drums (only on "Leave Them All Behind (demo version)"
 Jordan Hastings – drums, percussion

Additional personnel
 Eric Ratz – engineering
 Kenny Luong – digital engineering
 Chris Lord-Alge – mixing (all tracks except track 2)
 Rich Costey – mixing (track 2)
 Ted Jensen – mastering
 Nik Karpen – assistant engineering
 Martin Cooke – assistant engineering
 Luke Schindler – assistant engineering
 Ryan Jones – assistant engineering
 Igor Hofbauer – artwork and illustrations
 Antje Schröder – layout and package design

Charts

Weekly charts

Year-end charts

Certifications

References

External links 
 
 
 

2016 albums
Billy Talent albums